is a former Japanese football player.

Playing career
Ogura was born in Kanagawa Prefecture on August 26, 1970. After graduating from Waseda University, he joined Gamba Osaka in 1993. Although he played several matches as side back, he could not play many matches. In 1995, he moved to Japan Football League club Kyoto Purple Sanga. He retired end of 1995 season.

Club statistics

References

External links

1970 births
Living people
Waseda University alumni
Association football people from Kanagawa Prefecture
Japanese footballers
J1 League players
Japan Football League (1992–1998) players
Gamba Osaka players
Kyoto Sanga FC players
Association football defenders